Alina Petrauskaitė (born 21 October 1987) is a Lithuanian former footballer who played as a defender. She has been a member of the Lithuania women's national team.

International career
Petrauskaitė capped for Lithuania at senior level during the UEFA Women's Euro 2009 qualifying (preliminary round).

References

1987 births
Living people
Women's association football defenders
Lithuanian women's footballers
Lithuania women's international footballers
Gintra Universitetas players